Mercado Modelo is a central municipal fruit and vegetable wholesale market in of Montevideo, Uruguay. The area around the installations, which occupy several blocks of the Mercado Modelo–Bolívar barrio, has also taken on the name of the market, hence the composite name of the entire barrio.

In March 2009, the then mayor of Montevideo, Ricardo Ehrlich, announced that the market would be moved to the west of Montevideo.

The barrio

As a barrio (neighbourhood or district) of Montevideo, Mercado Modelo is part of the Mercado Modelo–Bolívar composite barrio. It shares borders with Bolívar to the northwest, Pérez Castellanos to the north, Villa Española to the east, Unión to the southeast and Larrañaga to the southwest. The barrio is home to the market of the same name, as well as to several big cold storage units, such as the Frigorifico Modelo and the Frigorifico Uruguayo.

Educational facilities
 Colegio y Liceo Corazón de María (private, Roman Catholic, Franciscan Sisters of Christ the King)

Places of worship
 Church of the Holy Apostles (Roman Catholic, Pallottine Fathers)

See also 
Barrios of Montevideo

Notes

External links

 Info site for Mercado Modelo (Spanish)
 Mercado Modelo info (Spanish)

Economy of Uruguay
Barrios of Montevideo